The Men's sabre event took place on November 6, 2010 at the Grand Palais in Paris.

Sabre individual

References

External links
 Bracket

2010 World Fencing Championships